Cyperus mirus is a species of sedge that is native to eastern parts of Australia.

See also 
 List of Cyperus species

References 

mirus
Plants described in 1908
Flora of Queensland
Flora of New South Wales
Taxa named by Charles Baron Clarke